The  is a professional wrestling world tag team championship owned by the New Japan Pro-Wrestling (NJPW) promotion. The title was introduced on December 12, 1985 at an NJPW live event. The IWGP Tag Team Championship is one of two tag team titles contested for in NJPW; the IWGP Junior Heavyweight Tag Team Championship is also sanctioned by NJPW. According to NJPW's official website, the IWGP Tag Team Championship is considered the "IWGP Heavyweight Class", while the Junior Heavyweight Tag Team Championship is listed as the "IWGP Jr. Tag Class". Like most professional wrestling championships, the title is won via the result of a scripted match. Title changes usually happen at NJPW-promoted events; although the title has only changed hands twice at a non-NJPW event, it has been defended in several other promotions.

History
Before the IWGP championship system was created, New Japan Pro-Wrestling featured the NWA North American Tag Team Championship, a title originally based in Los Angeles, and the WWF International Tag Team Championship, a title with license from the World Wrestling Federation, which was abandoned when the WWF working relationship ended.

The inaugural champions were Kengo Kimura & Tatsumi Fujinami, who defeated Antonio Inoki & Seiji Sakaguchi in the final of a tournament to win the championship on December 12, 1985, at an NJPW live event. In addition to NJPW, the IWGP Tag Team Championship was also contested in the United States-based promotions World Championship Wrestling (WCW) (now defunct) in the early 1990s, and Total Nonstop Action Wrestling (TNA) in 2009, and in the Mexican lucha libre promotion Consejo Mundial de Lucha Libre in 2005.

On October 30, 2005, in Kobe, Japan, Hiroyoshi Tenzan & Masahiro Chono defeated Hiroshi Tanahashi & Shinsuke Nakamura to begin their fifth overall reign as a team. On July 2, 2006, an interim tag team title was created when Tenzan & Chono showed signs of inactivity. Shiro Koshinaka & Togi Makabe defeated the teams of Yuji Nagata & Naofumi Yamamoto and Giant Bernard & Travis Tomko in a Three-Way Match to become the first interim champions. NJPW president Simon Kelly Inoki stripped Tenzan & Chono of the IWGP Tag Team Championship on September 20, 2006, after Tenzan & Chono ceased teaming. Manabu Nakanishi & Takao Omori, who defeated Koshinaka & Makabe on July 17, 2006 to become the interim champions, were recognized as the IWGP Tag Team Champions on September 28, 2006 by NJPW.

In 2009, The British Invasion defeated Team 3D on July 21, 2009 at a TNA television taping for the championship. Afterwards, NJPW released a statement announcing that they did not sanction the defense nor the title change, and as such did not recognize the reign. They continued to recognize Team 3D as the current champions and proclaimed that the next title defense would be by Team 3D and would be sanctioned by NJPW. On August 10, 2009, NJPW issued another press release stating that they were now recognizing The British Invasion of Brutus Magnus & Doug Williams as the current IWGP Tag Team Champions, making the reign official.

Reigns

Hiroyoshi Tenzan currently holds the record for most reigns by an individual wrestler, with twelve. Tenzan's combined twelve reign lengths add up to 1,988 days, which is the most of any champion. At seven reigns, the Guerrillas of Destiny (Tama Tonga & Tanga Loa) hold the record for most by a team. Tenzan & Masahiro Chono's combined five reign lengths add up to 1,010 days (the most of any team). At  days, Bad Intentions' (Giant Bernard & Karl Anderson) only reign is the longest in the title's history. Keiji Mutoh & Shiro Koshinaka's only reign is the shortest, at six days. Currently, Bad Intentions' only reign has the most defenses, with ten. There are 20 reigns shared between 18 teams that are tied for the fewest successful defenses, with zero. Overall, there have been 97 reigns shared between 85 wrestlers. 

Bishamon (Hirooki Goto and Yoshi-Hashi) are the current champions in their second reign. They defeated FTR (Cash Wheeler and Dax Harwood) on January 4, 2022 at Wrestle Kingdom 17 in Tokyo, Japan

References
General

Specific

External links
NJPW.co.jp

New Japan Pro-Wrestling championships
Tag team wrestling championships
1985 establishments in Japan